Senator Fulton may refer to:

Charles William Fulton (1853–1918), Oregon State Senate
James G. Fulton (1903–1971), Pennsylvania State Senate
John H. Fulton (1792–1836), Virginia State Senate
Marcus Fulton (died 1892), Wisconsin State Senate
Richard Fulton (1927–2018), Tennessee State Senate
Robert D. Fulton (born 1929), Iowa State Senate
Tony Fulton (Nebraska politician) (born 1972), Nebraska State Senate
William S. Fulton (1795–1844), U.S. Senator from Arkansas from 1836 to 1844